Gennaro Lombardi was an Italian immigrant who moved to the United States in 1897, and known for opening the first pizzeria in the United States, Lombardi's. He opened a small grocery store in New York City's Little Italy. An employee of his, Antonio Totonno Pero, also an Italian immigrant, began making pizza for the store to sell. Their pizza became so popular that Lombardi opened the first US pizzeria in 1905, naming it simply Lombardi's.

Although Lombardi was influenced by the pies of Naples, he was forced to adapt pizza to Americans. The wood-fired ovens and mozzarella di bufala were substituted with coal powered ovens and fior di latte (made from cow's milk), and so began the evolution of the American Pie. In 1924, Totonno left Lombardi's and followed the expanding New York City Subway lines to Coney Island, where he opened Totonno's.

See also
Italian-American cuisine
New York-style pizza

References

Year of birth missing
Year of death missing
Pizza chain founders
American people of Italian descent
Businesspeople from New York City
American food company founders
Pizza in New York City